Adekekuli  is a village in the southern state of Karnataka, India. It is located in the Honavar taluk of Uttara Kannada district.

See also
 Uttara Kannada
 Districts of Karnataka

References

External links
 http://Uttara Kannada.nic.in/

Villages in Uttara Kannada district